= Raycen Raines =

Raycen American Horse Raines, born Raycen Ballard, is a Navy veteran and businessman. Raines is an enrolled member of the Oglala Sioux Tribe.

== Early life ==
Raycen Ballard was possibly born on the Pine Ridge Indian Reservation or Portland, Oregon, to William Ballard and Evelyn Clifford. Raines served in the United States Navy and attended San Diego City College. In 2011, he was enrolled in the Oglala Sioux Tribe and changed his name to Raycen American Horse Raines. Other names that Raines has used include Raycen A. Ballard, Raycen A. Horseballard, and Raycen C. Rummell.

== Professional background ==
Raines operated American Horse Consulting before moving to Pine Ridge. As a representative of Raindancer Resource Management, Raines proposed several projects to the tribe, such as the acquisition of Saigon National Bank, the pursuit of Housing and Urban Development grants, small business development, and a wind farm, but these were not approved. Raines started the American Horse Tribal Development company and the Wakpamni Lake Community Corporation.

Raines was under scrutiny when he began pursuing online payday lending as a means of bringing in more money for the Pine Ridge Reservation.
